"Ruleta" is a song by Mexican Mexican singer and actress, Danna Paola. It was released as the first single from her fourth self-titled album on February 28, 2012, through digital distribution. "Ruleta" is styled in the genre of teen pop, with electronic touches.

Music video 
The music video for the song was filmed in Guadalajara, Jalisco, at Selva Mágica amusement park, in January, 2012. Paola was accompanied by over 30 dancers at the video shoot. The video premiered on a Google+ hangout which Paola attended, on 14 March 2012, on her Vevo account, her personal account on YouTube, as on her official website.

References

External links 
 "Ruleta" on Vevo

Danna Paola songs
Universal Music Group singles
2012 singles
Songs written by Paty Cantú
Songs written by Angela Dávalos
2011 songs